Acetylthiocholine is an acetylcholine analog used in scientific research.

References

Thiocholine esters
Thioesters
Quaternary ammonium compounds
Acetate esters